Bruce Wolfe's statue of Barbara Jordan on the University of Texas at Austin campus was erected in 2009.

See also

 2009 in art

References

2009 sculptures
Monuments and memorials in Texas
Outdoor sculptures in Austin, Texas
Sculptures of women in Texas
Statues in Texas
University of Texas at Austin campus